The First Schleswig War was a military conflict in southern Denmark and northern Germany rooted in the Schleswig-Holstein Question, contesting the issue of who should control the Duchies of Schleswig, Holstein and Lauenburg. Ultimately, the Danish side proved victorious with the diplomatic support of the great powers.

As the government, merchants, students, landowners and other upper class at the time spoke German, Low German was lingua franca in most of northern Europe at the time, the Germans claim it was mainly German-speaking areas, but the majority of the people were native Danish and Frisian speaking peasants and servants. Their languages would be systematically oppressed by the Germans over the next 100 years.

The conflict is known as the Three Years' War in Denmark.  In Germany, the war is called the Schleswig-Holstein War but also as the Schleswig-Holstein Uprising.

In March 1848, the German population of Schleswig, Holstein and Lauenburg rebelled against their duke who was also the king of Denmark. They created a provisional government and army. As Holstein and Lauenburg were member states of the German Confederation, the Confederation supported the rebels by a federal war (Bundeskrieg) according to its statutes. This was continued by the German Central Government (of the federal state that replaced the Confederation in 1848/49-51). Most of the German troops were delivered by Prussia.

Denmark was supported by the great powers, especially Britain and Russia. The duchies were close to an important Baltic seaway connecting both powers. The war was interrupted in August 1848 by the armistice of Malmö but started again with a Danish offensive in February 1849.

In summer 1850, Prussia had to back down and leave the rebels to their fate. On 1 April 1851 the Schleswig-Holstein army was disbanded. The London Protocol of 1852 was the final settlement of the conflict. The great powers confirmed the Danish king to be the duke of the duchies but also declared that the duchies had to remain independent from Denmark proper.

Background
At the beginning of 1848, Denmark included the Duchy of Schleswig, and the king of Denmark ruled the duchies of Holstein and Saxe-Lauenburg within the German Confederation. The majority of the ethnic Germans in Denmark lived in these areas. Germans made up a third of the country's population, and the three duchies accounted for half of Denmark's economy. The Napoleonic Wars, which had ended in 1815, had fanned both Danish and German nationalism. Pan-German ideology had become highly influential in the decades prior to the wars, and writers such as Jacob Grimm (1785–1863) and the Norwegian Peter Andreas Munch (1810–1863) argued that the entire peninsula of Jutland had been populated by Germans before the arrival of the Danes and that therefore Germans could justifiably reclaim it. Jens Jacob Asmussen Worsaae (1821–1885), an archaeologist who had excavated parts of the Danevirke, countered the pro-German claims, writing pamphlets which argued that there was no way of knowing the language of the earliest inhabitants of Danish territory, that Germans had more solid historical claims to large parts of France and England, and that Slavs by the same reasoning could annex parts of eastern Germany.

The conflicting aims of Danish and German nationalists contributed to the outbreak of the First Schleswig War. Danish nationalists believed that Schleswig, but not Holstein, should be a part of Denmark, as Schleswig contained a large number of Danes, whilst Holstein did not. German nationalists believed that Schleswig, Holstein, and Lauenburg should remain united, and their belief that Schleswig and Holstein should not be separated led to the two duchies being referred to as Schleswig-Holstein. Schleswig became a particular source of contention, as it contained a large number of Danes, Germans and North Frisians. Another cause of the war was the legally questionable change to the rules of ducal succession in the duchies.

King Christian VIII of Denmark died in January 1848. His only legitimate son, the future Frederick VII, seemed unable to beget heirs, thus the duchies appeared likely to pass to the rule of the House of Oldenburg, which might have resulted in a division of Denmark. Accordingly, Christian VIII had decreed (8 July 1846) a change to the succession law in the duchies to allow succession through the female line. The implementation of this law was illegal.

The question of Schleswig-Holstein was also a major concern of the other European powers. In order to maintain access to the Baltic, the British Foreign Secretary Lord Palmerston preferred that control of the Danish straits linking the North Sea to the Baltic Sea not be controlled by any major European power such as Prussia. From Palmerston's viewpoint, having a relatively weak power such as Denmark maintain control of the Danish straits was far preferable to having a strong power, and as such Britain tended to support the Danish claims, believing that a Danish-Prussian war might lead to Prussia annexing not just the two duchies, but also all of Denmark. Likewise, the Emperor Nicholas I of Russia supported Denmark as he did not want a strong power controlling the Danish straits. Nicholas also believed that if Denmark were defeated even without being annexed, it might lead to the Danes joining a Scandinavian Union that would pose a potential threat to the ability of the Baltic fleet of the Imperial Russian Navy to leave the Baltic. France, the European power most opposed to German unification, was due to the Revolution of 1848 unable to take a strong stand on German affairs.

In Berlin, the foreign policy decision-making was described as "chaotic" with the weak and indecisive King Fredrich Wilhelm IV receiving conflicting advice from rival groups of advisers about what to do. However, in the aftermath of the Revolution of 1848, which had damaged the prestige of the House of Hohenzollern as fighting had broken out in the streets of Berlin, it was felt essential to take a bold foreign policy step which would restore the status of the Prussian state. Although, the king and his advisers were not German nationalists, the German liberals opposed to the absolutist Prussian monarchy were, and in this way it was believed that launching a war in the name of German nationalism would bring many of the people otherwise opposed to the Prussian state around to supporting it.

In addition, the chaos of the revolution of 1848 was felt to offer a unique opportunity to create a greater Prussia by seizing territory, all the more as France was unable to act. However, the king and his advisers were not prepared to risk a general European war over the Schleswig-Holstein question. Joseph von Radowitz, the king's most trusted adviser, wrote in his diary: "The present political-military crisis cannot drag on, it must come to a rapid conclusion". Radowitz was prepared to support a war provided it would be brought to a victorious conclusion swiftly, which would allow Prussia to present the other European powers with a fait accompli. Knowing of the intense Russian opposition to Prussia controlling the Danish straits, Radowitz advised the king to limit the war to the two duchies and not allow Prussian troops to enter Jutland, which he predicted would lead to "unforeseeable consequences" as it was likely that Russia would intervene. The Prussian Foreign Minister Heinrich Alexander von Arnim supported war, believing that Prussia could occupy the two duchies within 8 days, leaving Britain and Russia no time to react.

Both Russia and Britain were opposed to Denmark losing control of the Danish straits, but were otherwise supportive of Prussia. Palmerston supported a stronger Prussia and even a Germany unified under Prussian leadership as a way of weakening France. The sister of King Fredrich Wilhelm was married to the Emperor Nicholas I, and the Prussian king believed that his brother-in-law could be persuaded to accept Prussia seizing control of the two duchies. Furthermore, Nicolas was well known to be an intense admirer of Prussian militarism and saw Prussia as the stronger ally in the so-called informal "eastern bloc" that consisted of Russia, Prussia and Austria. The emperor saw Prussia as the more reliable partner in opposing Polish nationalism than the Austrian empire, hence his preference for Prussia over Austria in the "eastern bloc".  Nicholas had long made it known that he viewed a Prussian-dominated Germany as a welcome development, which he saw as a way of weakening France, the nation that he hated and feared the most. Fredrich Wilhelm did not want to risk a confrontation with either Britain and/or Russia, and was only persuaded to act when he was convinced a war would not cause such a confrontation

Trigger
Schleswig-Holsteinian Prince Frederik of Noer took the 5th "Lauenburger" Rifle Corps (Jägerkorps) and some students of Kiel university to take over the fortress of Rendsburg in Schleswig-Holstein. The fortress contained the main armoury of the duchies, and the 14th, 15th, and 16th Infantry Battalions, the 2nd Regiment of Artillery, as well as some military engineers. When Noer's force arrived, they found that the gates to the fortress had been left open for an unknown reason and promptly walked in, surprising the would-be defenders. After delivering a speech to the defenders, the prince secured the allegiance of the battalions and regiment of artillery to the provisional government. Danish officers who had been serving in the defence of the fortress were allowed to leave for Denmark on the assurance that they did not fight against Schleswig-Holstein in the coming war.

Course of the war

1848

Wishing to defeat Denmark before German troops arrived to support them, 7,000 Schleswig-Holstein volunteers under General Krohn occupied Flensborg on 31 March. Over 7,000 Danish soldiers landed east of the city, and Krohn, fearing he would be surrounded, ordered his forces to withdraw. The Danes were able to reach the Schleswig-Holsteiners before they were able to retreat, and the subsequent Battle of Bov on 9 April was a Danish victory.  At the battle, the Prince of Noer, senior commander of the Schleswig-Holstein forces, did not arrive until two hours after fighting had started, and the Schleswig-Holsteiners were more prepared for the withdrawal they had intended to make than for an engagement.

A timeline of events is shown thus:
 12 April: The German Confederate Diet recognized the provisional government of Schleswig and commissioned Prussia to enforce its decrees. General Wrangel was also ordered to occupy the city of Schleswig.
 19 April: Prussian troops cross the Dannevirke into Schleswig
 23 April: Prussian victory in battle at Schleswig
 23 April: German victory in battle at Mysunde
 24 April: Hanoverian victory in battle at Oversø
 2 May: Capture of Fredericia by Prussian forces
 27 May: Battle at Sundeved
 28 May: Battle of Nybøl
 5 June: Danish victory over Germans in battle at Dybbøl Hill
 7 June: Battle at Hoptrup
 30 June: Battle at Bjerning

The Germans had embarked on this course of participation in the Schleswig-Holstein War alone, without the European powers.  The other European powers were united in opposing any dismemberment of Denmark, even Austria refusing to assist in enforcing the German view. Sweden landed 7,000 troops on the Isle of Fyn opposite Jutland to assist the Danes; Tsar Nicholas I of Russia, speaking with authority as head of the senior Gottorp line, pointed out to King Frederick William IV of Prussia the risks of a collision. Great Britain, though the Danes had rejected her mediation, threatened to send her fleet to assist in preserving the status quo.

It was Russian diplomatic intervention that decided the outcome of the war in April 1848. The Russian ambassador in Berlin, Peter von Mayendroff, delivered a note to King Fredrich Wilhelm stating that Russia regarded the advance of the Prussian troops towards Jutland as an extremely unfriendly act as the note stated: "The invasion, intended for Jutland, seriously injuries the interests of all the powers bordering on the Baltic, and stretches to the breaking point the political equilibrium throughout the north which was established in the treaties". To reinforce the point, the empress of Russia wrote to her brother, King Fredrich Wilhelm, saying: "It is your troops who have grabbed the weak Denmark with their superior force. The war can be expanded widely if you pursue it. Stop! There is still time! Think about the difficulties Germany has to battle in order to bring about inner security, the dangers which threaten in the West. Do not force upon the Tsar the necessity to come to the assistance with strong measures of another state whose downfall Russia cannot regard with indifference and will not tolerate. It cannot come to pass that Denmark is absorbed into Germany; of this you can be certain".  Nicholas ordered Russia to mobilise, sent a squadron of the Russian Baltic fleet to Danish waters as a show of support, and politely told his brother-in-law he was willing to risk war over the issue. The Russian threats had the desired impact on Frederich Wilhelm who now claimed to have been misled by von Arnim into intervening in the war.

The fact that Prussia had entered the war on behalf of the revolutionary forces in Schleswig-Holstein created a great number of ironies.  The newly elected Frankfurt Diet tended to support the incursion into the Schleswig-Holstein War while King Frederick William did not.  Indeed, Frederick William ordered Friedrich von Wrangel, commanding the German army, to withdraw his troops from the duchies; but the general refused, asserting that he followed order from the new German Central Government and not of the King of Prussia. Wrangel proposed that, at the very least, any treaty concluded should be presented for ratification to the German National Assembly.

Furthermore, on 7 August 1848 Archduke John as head of the Provisional Central Power published three additional demands upon the Danes:

 That persons to be elected for the formation of a new common government for the duchies of Holstein and Schleswig, before the conclusion of the armistice, are expressly and specifically agreed among the contracting parties in such a way that the existence and the prosperous effectiveness of the new government are guaranteed;
 That in the duchies, existing laws and ordinances mentioned in Article VII. all are expressly permitted up to the conclusion of the armistice;
 That troops remaining in the duchies of Holstein and Schleswig under Article VIII shall all be under the orders of the German commander-in-chief (Wrangel).

The Danes rejected this proposal outright and negotiations were broken off.

Prussia was now confronted on the one side by German nationalists urging it to action, on the other side by the European powers threatening dire consequences should it persist. After painful hesitation, Frederick William chose what seemed the lesser of two evils, and, on 26 August, Prussia signed a convention at Malmö which yielded to practically all the Danish demands. The Holstein estates appealed to the German National Assembly, which hotly took up their cause, but it was soon clear that the German Central Government had no means of enforcing its views. In the end the convention was ratified at Frankfurt. The convention was essentially nothing more than a truce establishing a temporary modus vivendi. The main issues, left unsettled, continued to be hotly debated.

In October, at a conference in London, Denmark suggested an arrangement on the basis of a separation of Schleswig from Holstein, despite their historical affiliation dating back to 1460, with Schleswig having a separate constitution under the Danish crown.

1849
 27 January: The London conference result was supported by Great Britain and Russia and accepted by Prussia and the German parliament in Frankfurt. The negotiations broke down, however, on the refusal of Denmark to yield the principle of the indissoluble union with the Danish crown.
 23 February: The truce came to an end.
 3 April: The war was renewed. At this point Nicholas I intervened in favour of peace.  However, Prussia, conscious of her restored strength and weary of the intractable temper of the Frankfurt parliament, determined to take matters into her own hands.
 3 April: Danish victory over Schleswig-Holstein forces in battle at Adsbøl.
 5 April: Battle of Eckernförde
 6 April: Battles at Ullerup and Avnbøl.
 13 April: Danish victory over Saxon forces in battle at Dybbøl.
 23 April: Battle at Kolding.
 31 May: Danes stop Prussian advance through Jutland in cavalry battle at Vejlby.
 4 June: inconclusive Battle of Heligoland (1849)
 6 July: Danish victory in sortie from Fredericia.
 10 July: Another truce was signed. Schleswig, until the peace, was to be administered separately, under a mixed commission; Holstein was to be governed by a vicegerent of the German Empire (an arrangement equally offensive to German and Danish sentiment). A settlement seemed as far off as ever. The Danes still clamoured for the principle of succession in the female line and union with Denmark, the Germans for that of succession in the male line and union with Holstein.

1850
In April 1850, Prussia, which had pulled out of the war after the treaty of Malmö, proposed a definitive peace on the basis of the status quo ante bellum and postponement of all questions as to mutual rights. To Palmerston the basis seemed meaningless and the proposed settlement  would settle nothing. Nicholas I, openly disgusted with Frederick William's submission to the Frankfurt Parliament, again intervened. To him Duke Christian of Augustenborg was a rebel. Russia had guaranteed Schleswig to the Danish crown by the 1773 Treaty of Tsarskoye Selo. As for Holstein, if the King of Denmark could not deal with the rebels there, he himself would intervene as he had done in Hungary. The threat was reinforced by the menace of the European situation. Austria and Prussia were on the verge of war (see Autumn Crisis 1850), and the sole hope of preventing Russia from entering such a war on the side of Austria lay in settling the Schleswig-Holstein question in a manner desirable to it. The only alternative, an alliance with the hated Napoleon Bonaparte's nephew, Louis Napoleon, who was already dreaming of acquiring the Rhine frontier for France in return for his aid in establishing German sea-power by the ceding of the duchies, was abhorrent to Frederick William.
 8 April: Karl Wilhelm von Willisen became the Supreme Commander of the German Forces.
 2 July: A treaty of peace between Prussia and Denmark was signed at Berlin. Both parties reserved all their antecedent rights. Denmark was satisfied that the treaty empowered the King of Denmark to restore his authority in Holstein with or without the consent of the German Confederation. Danish troops now marched in to coerce the refractory duchies. While the fighting went on, negotiations among the powers continued.
 24–25 July: Danish victory in the Battle of Idstedt.
 28 July: Danish victory in cavalry battle at Jagel.
 2 August: Great Britain, France, Russia and Sweden-Norway signed a protocol, to which Austria subsequently adhered, approving the principle of restoring the integrity of the Danish monarchy.
 12 September: Battle at Missunde.
 4 October: Danish forces resist German siege at Friedrichstadt.
 24 November: Battle of Lottorf
 31 December: Skirmish at Möhlhorst.

1851
 May: The Copenhagen government made an abortive attempt to come to an understanding with the inhabitants of the duchies by convening an assembly of notables at Flensburg.
 6 December 1851: The Copenhagen government announced a project for the future organization of the monarchy on the basis of the equality of its constituent states, with a common ministry.

1852
 28 January: A royal letter announced the institution of a unitary state which, while maintaining the fundamental constitution of Denmark, would increase the parliamentary powers of the estates of the two duchies. This proclamation was approved by Prussia and Austria, and by the German confederal diet insofar as it affected Holstein and Lauenburg. The question of the Augustenborg succession made an agreement between the powers impossible.
 31 March: The Duke of Augustenborg resigned his claim in return for a money payment. Further adjustments followed.
 8 May: another London Protocol was signed. The international treaty that became known as the "London Protocol" was the revision of the earlier protocol, which had been ratified on 2 August 1850, by the major Germanic powers of Austria and Prussia. The second, actual London Protocol was recognized by the five major European powers (the Austrian Empire, the Second French Republic, the Kingdom of Prussia, the Russian Empire, and the United Kingdom of Great Britain and Ireland), as well as the two major Baltic Sea powers of Denmark and Sweden.

The Protocol affirmed the integrity of the Danish federation as a "European necessity and standing principle". Accordingly, the duchies of Schleswig (a Danish fief) and Holstein, and Lauenburg (sovereign states within the German Confederation) were joined by personal union with the King of Denmark. For this purpose, the line of succession to the duchies was modified, because Frederick VII of Denmark remained childless and hence a change in dynasty was in order. (The originally conflicting protocols of succession between the duchies and Denmark would have stipulated that, contrary to the treaty, the duchies of Holstein and Lauenburg would have had heads of state other than the King of Denmark.) Further, it was affirmed that the duchies were to remain as independent entities, and that Schleswig would have no greater constitutional affinity to Denmark than Holstein.

This settlement did not resolve the issue, as the German Diet had steadfastly refused to recognize the treaty, and asserted that the law of 1650 was still in force, by which the Duchies were not united to the state of Denmark, but only to the direct line of the Danish kings, and were to revert on its extinction, not to the branch of Glucksburg, but to the German ducal family of Augustenburg. Only twelve years passed before the Second Schleswig War in 1864 resulted in the king of Denmark transferring the disputed duchies to Austria and Prussia.

See also
 German exonyms for places in Denmark
 History of Schleswig-Holstein
 Revolutions of 1848
 Wars and battles involving Prussia

References

Further reading
 Price, Arnold. "Schleswig-Holstein" in Encyclopedia of 1848 Revolutions (2005) online
 
 Schlürmann, Jan. Die Schleswig-Holsteinische Armee 1848-1851 (Tönning, PhD Thesis 2004).
 Schlürmann, Jan. The German Volunteers of the 1st Schleswig War. An Overview of the Freikorps’ Organisation, Uniforms, Flags and Armament in 1848. In: Chakoten 62 [Dansk Militaerhistorisk Selkabet] (2007), no. 4, p. 16-20.
 Steefel, Lawrence D. The Schleswig-Holstein Question. 1863–1864 (Harvard U.P. 1923).

External links

 Guns used at the Battle of Fredericia 
 Time-line of Danish history
 Die Schlacht bei Idstedt 
 Die Schlacht bei Idstedt im Jahre 1850 
 Painting of the Battle of Isted
 Maps of Europe during the First Schleswig War (omniatlas)
 First Schleswig-Holstein War - First War of the Danish Duchies

Conflicts in 1848
Conflicts in 1849
Conflicts in 1850
Conflicts in 1851
 
Wars involving Denmark
Wars involving Prussia
19th century in Denmark
19th century in Germany
19th century in Prussia
Wars of succession involving the states and peoples of Europe
Denmark–Germany military relations
Denmark–Germany border